William Rignold (1836–1904) was an English actor.  Rignold began acting as a teenager, together with his brother George.

Biography
William Rignold was the first son of the actor William Ross Rignold (1813–1883) and his wife, the actress Patricia Blaxland (1800–1888). A second son, George, also entered the theatrical profession. Both the brothers were brought up as musicians, and William was a capable violinist, but they both forsook music for the stage in their late teens.

In 1860 Rignold had a leading role in The Dead Heart at the Theatre Royal, Bristol, and the following year he was judged "very amusing as a foppish man of the world" in The Romance of a Poor Young Man at the same theatre. His brother George was also a member of the company at the Theatre Royal. In the production of A Midsummer Night's Dream with which the new Theatre Royal, Bath, opened on 4 March 1863 William played Lysander, and George played Theseus, in a cast that included Charles Coghlan, Henrietta Hodson, Ellen Terry, William Robertson and his daughter Madge.

Rignold made his London debut in 1869 in Marie Antoinette at the Princess's Theatre, receiving a good review from the leading theatrical paper, The Era.  He followed this with successful appearances in Dion Boucicault's Presumptive Evidence, which played in a double bill with Handel's opera Acis and Galatea starring Blanche Cole. Rignold played Sir George Wilson in Robert Buchanan's Joseph's Sweetheart in 1888. In 1890, he appeared at Her Majesty's Theatre, Sydney, in The Merry Wives of Windsor. The lessee and manager was his brother George, who played Ford to William's Falstaff.

At the end of the century Rignold's eyesight failed, leaving him unable to perform. A benefit fund was set up, and a fund-raising show was given at the Lyric Theatre. Richard Temple, Vernon Cave and Powis Pinder performed Cox and Box, George Rignold gave a speech from Henry V, Sheridan's The Critic was given by a cast led by H. B. Irving and Constance Collier, and Trial by Jury was played by Rutland Barrington, Hayden Coffin, George Grossmith, Jr., Courtice Pounds, Evie Greene and others.  Lionel Monckton appeared as the Associate.

Notes

References
 "Rignall, George Richard", Australian Dictionary of Biography
 Adelphi Theatre: Actors and Actresses
 Theatre in Sydney, December 1890
 Review of Rignold performance

1836 births
1904 deaths
English male stage actors
19th-century English male actors